Conizonia anularis is a species of beetle in the family Cerambycidae. It was described by Holzschuh in 1984. It is known from Turkey.

References

Saperdini
Beetles described in 1984